Continental Cup may refer to
 Continental Cup (curling), annual curling tournament between North American and World teams
 Continental Cup (KHL), trophy presented to the annual winner of the Kontinental Hockey League regular season
 FA WSL Continental Cup, a cup competition for teams in the FA WSL (Women's Super League) in association football, named for sponsorship reasons
 IAAF Continental Cup, quadrennial track and field competition (formerly IAAF World Cup)
 IIHF Continental Cup, annual European ice hockey tournament
 Inter Continental Cup, minor national association football tournament
 WSE Continental Cup, annual roller hockey match between the WSE Champions League and the WSE Cup winners
 FIS Ski Jumping Continental Cup, annual ski jumping competition organised by the International Ski Federation
 Continental Cup (cricket), also known as Romania T20 Cup, is an annual Twenty20 International cricket competition

See also
Intercontinental Cup (disambiguation)